Rafael Corporán de los Santos (July 22, 1937 – March 5, 2012), better known as Corporán, was a TV producer, TV host, entrepreneur, political figure, and philanthropist from the Dominican Republic.

He died of a heart attack on 5 March 2012.

References

1937 births
2012 deaths
Mayors of places in the Dominican Republic
Dominican Republic philanthropists
People from Cotuí
Social Christian Reformist Party politicians
20th-century philanthropists